Muscle & Nerve is a monthly peer-reviewed medical journal covering neuromuscular medicine. It was founded in 1978 by Walter Bradley. It is published by John Wiley & Sons on behalf of the American Association of Neuromuscular & Electrodiagnostic Medicine, of which it has been the official journal since 1982. The editor-in-chief is Zachary Simmons (Pennsylvania State University). According to the Journal Citation Reports, the journal has a 2020 impact factor of 3.217, ranking it 106th out of 208 journals in the category "Clinical Neurology" and 174th out of 273 in the category "Neurosciences".

Editors-in-chief
The current editor-in-chief of Muscle & Nerve is Zachary Simmons, whose term as editor-in-chief began in January 2017. Previous editors-in-chief of the journal are:
Lawrence Phillips, II (2008–2016)
Michael Aminoff (1998–2007)
Jun Kimura (1988–1997)
Walter Bradley (1978–1987)

References

External links

Neurology journals
Publications established in 1978
Monthly journals
Wiley (publisher) academic journals
Academic journals associated with learned and professional societies of the United States
Neuroscience journals
English-language journals